Events from the year 1556 in France

Incumbents
 Monarch – Henry II

Events
 5 February – Truce of Vaucelles: Fighting temporarily ends between France and Spain.
 February – Royal edict against women who conceal their pregnancy.
 Summer – The false Martin Guerre appears in the village of Artigat.
 1 September – Dry summer leads to an early and poor harvest and forest fires in Normandy and the north.
 November – The Truce of Vaucelles collapses and the Italian War of 1551–1559 resumes between France and Spain. Spain takes control of the Flanders region, including the modern-day Nord.
 4 December – Harsh winter causes the Rhône to freeze near Arles.

Births
 7 March – Guillaume du Vair, statesman and philosopher (d. 1621)
 27 April – François Béroalde de Verville, novelist and poet (d. 1626)
 24 June – twin royal princesses
 Joan of Valois (stillborn)
 Victoria of France (d. 1556)
 18 October – Charles I, Duke of Elbeuf, nobleman (d. 1605)
 15 November – Jacques Davy Duperron, cardinal, politician and poet (d. 1618)
 27 December – Jeanne de Lestonnac, founder of the Sisters of the Company of Mary, Our Lady and saint (d. 1640)

Deaths
 24 June – Joan of France, royal princess (stillborn)
 17 August –  Victoria of France, royal princess (b. 1556)

See also

References

1550s in France